"Is This the World We Created...?" is a song by the British rock band Queen, which was originally released on their eleventh studio album The Works in 1984.

The song was played at every Queen concert from 1984 to 1986. It was part of the finale at Live Aid in 1985. The song is the shortest but one of the most famous songs on The Works.

Overview
"Is This the World We Created...?" was written in Munich after lead singer Freddie Mercury and guitarist Brian May watched the news of poverty in Africa; Mercury wrote most of the lyrics and May wrote the chords and made small lyrical contributions.

The song was recorded with an Ovation, but, in live performances, May played drummer Roger Taylor's Gibson Chet Atkins CE nylon-stringed guitar. A piano was tracked at the recording sessions for this song, but ultimately not included in the final mix. Originally, a Mercury composition, "There Must Be More to Life Than This" (which was around since the Hot Space sessions and finally ended up on his solo album Mr. Bad Guy) was supposed to be the album's last track. The song was written in the key of B minor, but the recording sounds one semitone lower.

The song was performed at Live Aid as an encore, with additional instruments and arrangements in the last part; changes were also present in the vocal line. A month before their 
Live Aid appearance, "Is This the World We Created…?" was Queen's contribution to the multi-artist compilation Greenpeace – The Album.

Personnel

Freddie Mercury – vocals
Brian May – acoustic guitar

References

1984 songs
Queen (band) songs
Protest songs
Songs written by Freddie Mercury
Songs written by Brian May
Song recordings produced by Reinhold Mack
British folk rock songs
Songs about poverty
Compositions in E minor